The Goodbye Girl is a 2004 American television comedy film directed by Richard Benjamin and written by Neil Simon, based on Simon's screenplay to the 1977 film of the same name. It stars Jeff Daniels and Patricia Heaton. It aired on TNT on January 16, 2004. Like the original film, it follows an actor who lives in an apartment along with his friend's ex-girlfriend, whom the friend has just abandoned, and her preteen daughter.

Cast 

 Jeff Daniels as Elliot Garfield
 Patricia Heaton as Paula McFadden
 Hallie Kate Eisenberg as Lucy McFadden 
 Lynda Boyd as Donna Douglas
 Alan Cumming as Mark
 Richard Benjamin as Oliver Fry
 Sharon Wilkins as Mrs. Crosby
 Marco Soriano as Ronnie Burns

 Woody Jeffreys as Eddie
 Emily Holmes as Rhonda
 Ron Halder as Lovell
 Ross Benjamin as Catesby
 Marie Stillin as Mark's Mother
 Kevin Durand as Earl
 Zag Margaret as Gretchen

References

External links
 

2004 television films
2004 films
2004 comedy films
American comedy television films
Comedy film remakes
Films about actors
Films directed by Richard Benjamin
Films scored by John Frizzell (composer)
Films set in New York City
Films with screenplays by Neil Simon
Remakes of American films
Television remakes of films
TNT Network original films
2000s American films